Neurocossus is a genus of moths in the family Cossidae.

Species
 Neurocossus khmer (Yakovlev, 2004)
 Neurocossus pinratanai (Yakovlev, 2004)
 Neurocossus speideli (Holloway, 1986)

References

External links
Natural History Museum Lepidoptera generic names catalog

Cossinae